Bosnian Cyrillic, widely known as Bosančica is a variant of the Cyrillic alphabet that originated in medieval Bosnia. The term was coined at the end of the 19th century by Ćiro Truhelka. It was widely used in modern-day Bosnia and Herzegovina and the bordering areas of modern-day Croatia (southern and middle Dalmatia and Dubrovnik regions). Its name in Bosnian-Croatian-Serbian is Bosančica and Bosanica the latter of which can be translated as Bosnian script. Serb scholars call it Serbian script, Serbian–Bosnian script, Bosnian–Serb Cyrillic, as part of variant of Serbian Cyrillic and the  term "bosančica" according to them is Austro-Hungarian propaganda. Croat scholars also call it Croatian script, Croatian–Bosnian script, Bosnian–Croat Cyrillic, harvacko pismo, arvatica or Western Cyrillic. For other names of Bosnian Cyrillic, see below.

The use of Bosančica amongst Bosnians was replaced by Arebica upon the introduction of Islam in Bosnia Eyalet, first amongst the elite, then amongst the wider public. The first book in Bosančica was printed by Frančesko Micalović in 1512 in Venice.

History and characteristic features

It is hard to ascertain when the earliest features of a characteristic Bosnian type of Cyrillic script had begun to appear, but paleographers consider the Humac tablet (a tablet written in Bosnian Cyrillic) to be the first document of this type of script and is believed to date from the 10th or 11th century. Bosnian Cyrillic was used continuously until the 18th century, with sporadic usage even taking place in the 20th century.

Historically, Bosnian Cyrillic is prominent in the following areas:

Passages from the Bible in documents of Bosnian Church adherents, 13th and 15th century.
Numerous legal and commercial documents (charters, letters, donations) of nobles and royalty from medieval Bosnian state in correspondence with the Republic of Ragusa and various cities in Dalmatia (e.g. the Charter of Ban Kulin, beginning in the 12th and 13th centuries, and reaching its peak in the 14th and 15th centuries.
Tombstone inscriptions on marbles in medieval Bosnia and Herzegovina, chiefly between 11th and 15th centuries.
Legal documents in central Dalmatia, like the Poljica Statute (1440) and other numerous charters from this area; Poljica and neighbourhood Roman Catholic church books used this alphabet until the late 19th century.
The "Supetar fragment" from the 12th century was found in Monastery of Saint Peter in the Forest in central Istria, among the stones of a collapsed southern monastery wall. Until the 15th century it was a Benedictine monastery and later a Pauline monastery. This finding could indicate that Bosančica spread all the way to Istria and Kvarner Gulf.
The Roman Catholic diocese in Omiš had a seminary (called arvacki šeminarij, "Croat seminary") active in the 19th century, in which arvatica letters were used.
Liturgical works (missals, breviaries, lectionaries) of the Roman Catholic Church from Dubrovnik, 15th and 16th century - the most famous is a printed breviary from 1512
The comprehensive body of Bosnian literacy, mainly associated with the Franciscan order, from the 16th to mid-18th century and early 19th century. This is by far the most abundant corpus of works written in Bosnian Cyrillic, covering various genres, but belonging to the liturgical literature: numerous polemical tractates in the spirit of the Counter-Reformation, popular tales from the Bible, catechisms, breviaries, historical chronicles, local church histories, religious poetry and didactic works. Among the most important writings of this circle are works of Matija Divković, Stjepan Matijević and Pavao Posilović.
After the Ottoman conquest, Bosnian Cyrillic was used, along with Arebica, by the Bosnian Muslim nobility, chiefly in correspondence, mainly from the 15th to 17th centuries (hence, the script has also been called begovica, "bey's script"). Isolated families and individuals could write in it even in the 20th century.

In conclusion, main traits of Bosnian Cyrillic include:

It was a form of Cyrillic script mainly in use in Bosnia and Herzegovina, central Dalmatia and Dubrovnik.
Its earliest monuments are from the 11th century, but the golden epoch covered the period from the 14th to 17th centuries. From the late 18th century it rather speedily fell into disuse to be replaced by the Latin script.
Its primary characteristics (scriptory, morphological, orthographical) show strong connection with the Glagolitic script, unlike the standard Church Slavonic form of Cyrillic script associated with Eastern Orthodox churches.
It had been in use, in ecclesiastical works, mainly in Bosnian Church and Roman Catholic Church in historical lands of Bosnia, Herzegovina, Dalmatia and Dubrovnik. Also, it was a widespread script in Bosnian Muslim circles, which, however, preferred modified Arabic aljamiado script. Serbian Orthodox clergy and adherents used mainly the standard Serbian Cyrillic of the Resava orthography.
The form of Bosnian Cyrillic has passed through a few phases, so although culturally it is correct to speak about one script, it is evident that features present in Bosnian Franciscan documents in the 1650s differ from the charters from Brač island in Dalmatia in the 1250s.

Polemics
The polemic about "ethnic affiliation" of Bosnian Cyrillic started in the 19th century, then reappeared in the mid-1990s. The polemic about attribution and affiliation of Bosnian Cyrillic texts seems to rest on following arguments:

Serbian scholars claim that it is just a variant of Serbian Cyrillic; actually, a "minuscle", or Italic (cursive) script devised at the court of Serbian king Stefan Dragutin, and accordingly, include Bosnian Cyrillic texts into the Serbian literary corpus. Authors in "Prilozi za književnost, jezik, istoriju i folklor" in 1956, go as far to state that Bosančica was a term introduced through Austro-Hungarian propaganda, and regarded it a type of cursive Cyrillic script, without specifics that would warrant an "isolation from Cyrillic". The main Serbian authorities in the field are Jorjo Tadić, Vladimir Ćorović, Petar Kolendić, Petar Đorđić, Vera Jerković, Irena Grickat, Pavle Ivić and Aleksandar Mladenović.
On the Croatian side, the split exists among philologists. One group basically challenges the letters being Serbian, and claims that majority of the most important documents of Bosnian Cyrillic had been written either before any innovations devised at the Serbian royal court happened, or did not have any historical connection with it whatsoever, thus considering Serbian claims on the origin of Bosnian Cyrillic to be unfounded and that the script, since they allege belonging to the Croatian cultural sphere, should be called not Bosnian, but Croatian Cyrillic. Other group of Croatian philologists acknowledges that "Serbian connection", as exemplified in variants present at the Serbian court of king Dragutin, did influence Bosnian Cyrillic, but, they aver, it was just one strand, since scriptory innovations have been happening both before and after the mentioned one. First group insists that all Bosnian Cyrillic texts belong to the corpus of Croatian literacy, and the second school that all texts from Croatia and only a part from Bosnia and Herzegovina are to be placed into Croatian literary canon, so they exclude c. half of Bosnian Christian texts, but include all Franciscan and the majority of legal and commercial document. Also, the second school generally uses the name "Western Cyrillic" instead of "Croatian Cyrillic" (or Bosnian Cyrillic, for that matter). Both schools allege that supposedly various sources, both Croatian and other European, call this script "Croatian letters" or "Croatian script". The main Croatian authorities in the field are Vatroslav Jagić, Mate Tentor, Ćiro Truhelka, Vladimir Vrana, Jaroslav Šidak, Herta Kuna, Tomislav Raukar, Eduard Hercigonja and Benedikta Zelić-Bučan.
 Jahić, Halilović, and Palić dismiss claims made by Croatian or Serbian philologists about national affiliation.
Ivan G. Iliev, in his "Short History of the Cyrillic Alphabet", summarizes the Cyrillic variant and acknowledges it was spread into and used in both Bosnia and Croatia, where these variants were called "bosančica" or "bosanica" in Bosnian and Croatian ('Bosnian script'), with Croats also calling it "arvatica" ('Croatian script') or "Western Cyrillic".

Legacy

In 2015, a group of artists started a project called "I write to you in Bosančica" which involved art and graphic design students from Banja Luka, Sarajevo, Široki Brijeg, and Trebinje.  Exhibitions of the submitted artworks will be held in Sarajevo, Trebinje, Široki Brijeg, Zagreb, and Belgrade. The purpose of the project was to resurrect the ancient script and show the "common cultural past" of all the groups in Bosnia and Herzegovina. The first phase of the project was to reconstruct all of the ancient characters by using ancient, handwritten documents.

Names
The name bosančica was first used by Fran Kurelac in 1861. Other instances of naming by individuals, in scholarship and literature or publications (chronological order, recent first):

poljičica, poljička azbukvica, among the people of Poljica and Frane Ivanišević (1863−1947)
srbskoga slovi ćirilskimi (Serbian Cyrillic letters) and bosansko-dalmatinska ćirilica (Bosnian-Dalmatian Cyrillic), by Croatian linguist Vatroslav Jagić (1838–1923)
bosanska ćirilica ("Bosnian Cyrillic"), by Croatian historian and Catholic priest Franjo Rački (1828–1894)
bosanska azbukva ("Bosnian alphabet"), by Catholic priest Ivan Berčić (1824–1870)
 (Bosnian-Catholic alphabet), by Franciscan writer Ivan Franjo Jukić (1818–1857)
 (Bosnian or Croatian Cyrillic alphabet), by Slovene linguist Jernej Kopitar (1780–1844)
bosanska brzopisna grafija ("Bosnian cursive graphics"), by E. F. Karskij
zapadna varijanta ćirilskog brzopisa ("Western variant of Cyrillic cursive"), by Petar Đorđić
 Serbian letters, by Bosnian Franciscan writer Matija Divković, who explains in preface to his Nauk krstjanski za narod slovinski, that he wrote "for the Slavic folk in correct and true Bosnian language", while Georgijević also notes that he referred to the Bosnian Cyrillic, which he wrote in, as "Serbian letters".

Gallery

See also
 Early Cyrillic alphabet
 Serbian Cyrillic alphabet
 Modern Cyrillic script
 Reforms of Russian orthography

References
Notes

Bibliography

 
 
 
 
 

Cyrillic alphabets
Bosnia and Herzegovina culture
Bosnian language
19th-century neologisms
 
 
Western calligraphy